Sorure Ahle Iman fi Alamat Zohour Sahab Al Zaman or Happiness of believers on the signs of Imam Mahdi' appearing was written on the subject of signs of Imam Mahdi the twelfth imam of Shiite by Ali ibn Abdul Karim Nili. The author narrated nearly one hundred and one narrations of ancestor's books. Some of these narrations are on the way of governing and periods of Imam Mahdi ruling.

Author
Sayyed baha Al Din Ali ibn Abdul KArim Nili is one of the great Shiite scholars of eight Hijrah Lunar. It is not realized when he was born. He is also the master of Ahmad ibn Fahad Hilli (died:841 lunar). It seems that he was also under supervision of Fakhr Al Mohqeqin the son of Allameh Hilli. He also has many pupils and writings.

introduction
Sorure Ahle Iman is the summary of the other book by the name of Al Qaybah of the very Author. Most of narrations reported in the book of Sorure Ahle Iman also mentioned in his other book such as "Al Anwar Al Moziah selected". Nili not only reported the narrations but also explained them in detail.

Authenticity
The book is a treatise in summary. This book also counted as a source for Allameh Hilli in Writing of Bihar al-Anwar. This book was unknown and unavailable for next generation of scholars.

style of writing
The book written in Arabic Language. The Author mentioned the Hadith narrated by Muhammed and his household on the Signs of Appearance of Imam Zaman in two Parts. One part concerned with the signs of Appearing and the other with events of that time. The Author just mentioned the name of last narrator in the regress of Narrators of Hadith.

source of book
The Author mentioned the sources in the last pages. Some of them are as follow:
 Kamal Al Din Ibn Babawayh
 Al Qaybah by Nomani
 Al Qaybah by Shaykh Tusi
 Al Ershad By Sheikh Mofid.

Sources
 Aqa Bozorg Tehrani, Zariah on Shiite Writings, Dar Al Azwa, Beirout, 1403 lunar
 Nili Ali Ibn Abdul Karim, Sorure Ahle Iman, Dalile Ma, Qom.1426 Lunar)

References

Hadith
Islamic theology books
1420s books